Cuale is a town and commune of Angola, located in the province of Malanje. Cuale is located in the Colonial of Emiliano Zapata also known as "Old Town" in the most popular area of Vallarta.

See also 

 Communes of Angola

References 

Populated places in Malanje Province